Matthew Mayfield is an American singer and songwriter from Birmingham, Alabama. Originally the lead singer in the group Moses Mayfield, which disbanded in 2008, Mayfield has moved on to a solo career. He announced the release of his debut EP, titled The Fire EP on August 25, 2008.

Not long after the band broke up, lead singer Matthew Mayfield started playing shows centered on the Birmingham, Alabama area, usually solo acoustic but occasionally with a new backing band. Within a year, he independently released an album of acoustic songs, including acoustic versions of songs that previously appeared on The Inside. He also revealed that Moses Mayfield broke up mainly due to disagreements with the record label.

Discography 
Between 2009 and 2010, Mayfield released five additional EPs (each one with a free song) : "Five Chances Remain Hers" on July 27, 2009, "Maybe Next Christmas" on December 21, 2009, "Breathe Out In Black" on February 9, 2010, "Man-Made Machines" on March 16, 2010, and "You're Not Home" on April 17, 2010. After the 2010 SXSW Music and Media Conference, the music analytics website Next Big Sound ranked Mayfield at No. 6 in its top ten list of the artists with the fastest growing buzz at the event. In 2010, Mayfield independently released his first full-length studio album, Now You're Free. With the release of the album, Mayfield has toured with such artists as Needtobreathe and Will Hoge.

EPs
Independent releases:

 The Fire EP (2008)
Seasons In Our Dreams
Dead To You (free song )
By Your Side
The Devil Within
First In Line
Razorblade
Element
As Long As You're Not Leaving

 Five Chances Remain Hers (2009)
Open Road
Her Name Was December
Lives Entwined
Timeless Art
Better
Wrapped In Rain

 Maybe Next Christmas (2009)
Maybe Next Christmas (free song )
So Long, So Long
Her Name Was December
Better (Kensington Rd. Sessions) (free song )
Fact or Fable (Kensington Rd. Sessions)
Old Friend
Virginia Gray

 Breathe Out In Black (2010)
Can't Change My Mind (free song )
Simple
Breathe Out In Black
Ease Your Mind
Revelation (Live)

 Man-Made Machines (2010)
Man-Made Machines (free song )
Safe & Sound
A Cycle
Who Am I
Golden Opportunity

 You're Not Home (2010)
The Last Ride
Missed Me
Fire Escape (free song )
Still Alive
Out on Our Own

 Irons in the Fire (2013)
In or Out
Look Me in the Eye
Miles & Miles
 Tonight (Remastered)
Follow You Down
Fire Escape (Catherine Marks Remix) [feat. John Paul White]
 Miles & Miles (Acoustic + Strings)
 Fire Escape (Remastered)

Studio albums

 Now You're Free (2011)
Come Back Home
Missed Me
Fire Escape
Man-Made Machines
Now You're Free
Element
Ghost
A Cycle
Tonight
Can't Change My Mind
Grow Old With You

 Now You're Free LP (2011) (Different track order)
Missed Me
Ghost
Come Back Home
Now You're Free
A Cycle
Grow Old With You
Fire Escape
Man-Made Machines
Element
Tonight
Can't Change My Mind

 A Banquet for Ghosts (2012)
Ain't Much More To Say
Take What I Can Get
Cold Winds
Track You Down
Heart In Wire
I Don't Know You At All
A Banquet For Ghosts
Carry Me
Always Be You
Beautiful
Safe And Sound

 Wild Eyes (2015)
Wild Eyes
Mess of a Man
Better Off Forgiven
Ride Away
On Your Knees
Why We Try (feat. Chelsea Lankes)
Tidal Wave
Quiet Lies
How To Breathe
Settle Down (feat. Amy Stroup)

 Recoil (2016)
History
Raw Diamond Ring
Indigo
Turncoat
God's Fault
Warfare on Repeat
Merry Go Round
Wolf in Your Darkest Room
Wreckage
Show Me
Long Way Down

 Gun Shy (2019)
Gun Shy 
Our Winds 
S.H.A.M.E.
Fall Behind 
Best of Me 
Broken Clocks
Keep My Distance 
Blackballed
Table For One 
When The Walls Break 
Simple

Press 
  A Musician's Journey: From Moses Mayfield to Matthew Mayfield - Birmingham Magazine
  Matthew Mayfield's 'The Fire EP' Delivers Refreshing Sound - The Samford Crimson
 Choice Cuts In Depth: Matthew Mayfield - Indie-Music.com
 Artist Interview – Matthew Mayfield – Birmingham rocker describes rugged life on the road - EarToTheGround Music

References

External links 
 Official Matthew Mayfield Site
 

Musicians from Birmingham, Alabama
American rock guitarists
American male guitarists
American rock singers
American rock songwriters
American male singer-songwriters
1983 births
Living people
Guitarists from Alabama
21st-century American singers
21st-century American guitarists
21st-century American male singers
Singer-songwriters from Alabama